Baseball was contested at the 1950 Central American and Caribbean Games in Guatemala City, Guatemala.

References
 

1950 Central American and Caribbean Games
1950
Central American and Caribbean Games